Walt Koken (born October 9, 1946, Columbia, Missouri) is an American claw-hammer banjo player, fiddler, and singer, who received the Nashville Old-Time String Band Association's Heritage Award for 2016. Koken was prominent in the old-time music revival during the 1960s, and continues to be a leader and mentor in the old-time music community today.

Biography

Family

Koken's mother, Helen Hawkins Koken Pickel, was a classical pianist and a kindergarten teacher. Her family was English; the Kokens were from Germany. Koken's father, John C. Koken, was a math professor. The Koken family arrived in New Orleans in 1850, then traveled up the Mississippi River to St. Louis (Milliner 2017). By 1892, the Koken Barber’s Supply Company of St. Louis held two barber chair patents; one for the first reclining Koken chair and one for the first hydraulic lift chair (Creek). In 1915 Walter F. Koken received a patent for the first electric Barber’s Chair (Patents 1917).

Music

Walt Koken started playing banjo at the age of thirteen. “In 1959, my brother had broken his arm, and heard that playing guitar might be a good way to get its strength back. He got his old guitar with a warped neck and high strings, and started strummin’ it. I really thought that was neat, and one day he came to me and said, “Why don’t you get a banjo, and we’ll make some money?” (Smith 2011)

Since 1965, Koken has played in multiple bands: the Busted Toe Mudthumpers, the Muskrat Ramblers, the Fat City String Band, the legendary Highwoods Stringband, and The Cacklin’ Hens and Roosters Too!. (last.fm) Currently, he plays fiddle-banjo duets with his partner and soul-mate Clare Milliner, as well as with Clare, Kellie Allen, and Pete Peterson as the old-time string band, Orpheus Supertones. In 2011, Walt and Clare completed their multi-year literary collaboration, The Milliner-Koken Collection of American Fiddle Tunes.

Discography

 The Original Fat City String Band (1999)
 The Highwoods Stringband, Feed Your Babies Onions (1994)
 Highwoods Stringband Live! (2004)
 Clare Milliner & Walt Koken, Just Tunes (2003)
 Orpheus Supertones, Bound to Have a Little Fun (2004)
 Orpheus Supertones, When the Roses Bloom in Dixieland (2006)
 Orpheus Supertones, Going to Town (2011)
 Walt Koken, Finger Lakes Ramble (1998)
 Walt Koken, Banjonique (1994)
 Walt Koken, Hei-Wa Hoedown (1995)
 Walt Koken, Sittin’ in the Catbird’s Seat (2012)
 Walt Koken, Slo-Mo Banjo DVD (2016)

Bibliography

 Sittin' in the Catbird's Seat - Transcriptions of Banjo Tunes from the CD, Walt Koken, Mudthumper Music, 2012.
 The Milliner-Koken Collection of American Fiddle Tunes, Clare Milliner and Walt Koken, Mudthumper Music, 2011.

References

 Creek, Cabin. n.d. 1908 Koken Barber Supply Co. Manufacturers St. Louis, USA. Accessed February 25, 2017. http://www.cabincreekcds.com/Koken1908.htm.
 Smith, Malcolm. "Livin' old-time with Walt Koken and Clare Milliner", Sing Out! The Folk Song Magazine (Vol 54, Issue 3, 2011)pp. 60–65
 last.fm. n.d. Walt Koken. Accessed February 25, 2017. https://www.last.fm/music/Walt+Koken/+wiki.
 Milliner, Clare, interview by Linda L. Henry. 2017.
 Milliner, Clare and Koken, Walt. 2011. The Milliner-Koken Collection of American Fiddle Tunes. Kennett Square, PA: Mudthumper Music.
 Patents, U.S. 1917. Barber's Chair. Accessed February 25, 2017. https://www.google.com/patents/US1242110.

External links
http://www.mudthumper.com/

Living people
1946 births
American banjoists
American fiddlers
21st-century violinists
Singers from Columbia, Missouri